In enzymology, a gamma-glutamyl-gamma-aminobutyrate hydrolase is an enzyme that catalyzes the chemical reaction

4-(gamma-glutamylamino)butanoate + H2O  4-aminobutanoate + L-glutamate

Thus, the two substrates of this enzyme are 4-(gamma-glutamylamino)butanoate and H2O, whereas its two products are 4-aminobutanoate and L-glutamate.

This enzyme belongs to the family of hydrolases, those acting on carbon-nitrogen bonds other than peptide bonds, specifically in linear amides.  The systematic name of this enzyme class is 4-(gamma-glutamylamino)butanoate amidohydrolase. Other names in common use include gamma-glutamyl-GABA hydrolase, PuuD, and YcjL.  This enzyme participates in urea cycle and metabolism of amino groups.

References

 

EC 3.5.1
Enzymes of unknown structure